Eastern Pennsylvania Conference may refer to:

Eastern Pennsylvania Conference, a high school sports conference in eastern Pennsylvania
Eastern Pennsylvania Conference (1937–1940), a former collegiate football conference
Eastern Pennsylvania Collegiate Basketball League, a former collegiate basketball conference

See also
Western Pennsylvania Conference, a former collegiate football conference